Alberto Augusto Antunes Festa (born 21 July 1939) is a Portuguese retired footballer who played as a right back.

Club career
Born in Santo Tirso, Porto District, Festa started and finished his 17-year senior career with local club F.C. Tirsense. In between, he represented FC Porto, where he appeared in 114 Primeira Liga matches.

Festa retired at the age of 33, after several injury problems.

International career
Festa earned 19 caps for Portugal, over three years. His debut came on 23 January 1963 against Bulgaria, for the 1964 European Nations' Cup qualifiers (0–1 replay loss in Rome).

Festa was selected for the 1966 FIFA World Cup squad, playing three matches in England for the third-placed team.

References

External links

1939 births
Living people
People from Santo Tirso
Portuguese footballers
Association football defenders
Primeira Liga players
Liga Portugal 2 players
F.C. Tirsense players
FC Porto players
Portugal international footballers
1966 FIFA World Cup players
Sportspeople from Porto District